Mamata Dash (nee Mohapatra ; born 4 October 1947) is an Odia poet, writer and translator. She was awarded the Odisha Sahitya Academy Award for her poetry collection Ekatra Chandrasurya.

Early life
Dash was born on 4 October 1947 at Jagatsinghpur. Her father Ramachandra Mohapatra was a doctor. Her mother was Pankajmala. She had four sisters and three brothers. Her early education came at Jagatsinghpur before she moved to Ravenshaw Girls School, Cuttack. She started writing at age of nine.

Works

Poetry collections 
 Naimisharanya
 Ekatra chandrasurjya
 
Nila Nirbapana
Hirabyabarna
Shubhradhara
Mayandhakara
Shunya chitrayana

Stories 
Anya Jagatara Sakala
Antarala Drushya
Arundhatira sandhya
Padma Purusha

Essays 
Ama Sahityare Shriradha bilasa
Atikramana
Aneka jharaka

Novels 
Kehi Jane bishakha

English 
A moment beyond time
Maker's of Indian literature -Bhubanaswara Behera

Translation 
Prathama Aloka
Bohu Thakuranira Hats
Chetanara  Abhiyatra
Bharatara punarjanma
Shri Ma nka Agenda

Recognition
 Odisha Sahitya Academy Award, 1987
 Bhanuji Rao Award from Gangadhara Rath foundation
 Bharata Naik Smriti Sammana from Sambalpur University, Odisha
 Bishuba Sammana
 Bharatiya Bhasa Parishada Award
 Kalindi Charan smruti sammana
 Sachi Rautray sammana
 Sammana from Dharitri, Istahaar, Lekhaka samukhya, nilakain, Phakir Morgan Sahitya Sansada
 Fellowship from Government of India (Department of culture)

References

1947 births
Living people
Women writers from Odisha
Poets from Odisha
Indian women poets
Odia-language poets
Odia-language writers
Indian women children's writers
People from Jagatsinghpur district
Recipients of the Odisha Sahitya Akademi Award
20th-century Indian poets
21st-century Indian poets